Jerzy Adamski (14 March 1937 – 6 December 2002) was a Polish featherweight boxer who won a silver medal at the 1960 Olympics and a European title in 1959. He won six national titles and had an amateur record of 237 wins, 10 losses and 23 draws. Adamski was awarded the Order of Polonia Restituta.

Adamski was born in a family of a railway worker, and had brothers Ryszard and Jan and a sister Lucyna. He graduated from a technical school with a degree in mechanical and electrical engineering.

References

1937 births
2002 deaths
Olympic boxers of Poland
Olympic silver medalists for Poland
Boxers at the 1960 Summer Olympics
Olympic medalists in boxing
Astoria Bydgoszcz members
Sportspeople from Bydgoszcz
People from Sierpc
Sportspeople from Masovian Voivodeship
Polish male boxers
Medalists at the 1960 Summer Olympics
Featherweight boxers
20th-century Polish people
21st-century Polish people